Sangita Jindal is an Indian businesswoman and the chairperson of the JSW Foundation, which drives social development projects within the JSW Group. She also leads Jindal Arts Centre and she is the President of Art India magazine, a leading art magazine focusing on contemporary art practices and critical theory which promotes interdisciplinary arts activity, in India. JSW Foundation has also won the Golden Peacock Award for CSR in 2009 and 2019.

She is married to Sajjan Jindal and is the mother of businessman Parth Jindal.

Biography 
Jindal was born in Calcutta (now Kolkata) on 30 August 1962 to Kailash Kumar Kanoria and Urmila Kanoria. She has one sibling Saket Kanoria. She completed her education at St. Xavier's College, Ahmedabad. She has a son named Parth Jindal and two daughters Tarini Jindal Handa and Tanvi Jindal Shete.

Career 

At JSW Foundation she tries to improve the quality of life of people by empowering them and by supporting sustainable scalable solutions. She also engages in philanthropic work, including vocational training and partnerships and alliances with institutions, holistic development for the mentally challenged, and the empowerment of women through a rural BPO, infant and maternal health initiative called Mission Hazaar Campaign adopted by Ministry of Women and Child Development under the "Beti Padhao, Beti Bachao" campaign.

She has been working towards the protection of the environment and to the institutionalisation of Earth Care Awards.

Through JSW Foundation she has contributed towards conservation and restoration of the interiors of Sir J.J. School of Arts.

An Eisenhower Fellow, she is an advisor for TEDx Gateway.
She was invited to chair the UN Women's Empowerment Principles Initiative in India.

She is also awarded the Women Philanthropist Award by FICCI.

She was also the chairperson of the Kala Ghoda Festival from 2000 to 2003.

She has created the Hampi Foundation that has undertaken conservation work at three temples in Hampi.

References 

1962 births
Living people
Businesspeople from Kolkata
JSW Group
Jindal family